KMGC (104.5 FM, "The Rhythm of South Arkansas") is a radio station broadcasting an urban adult contemporary music format. Licensed to Camden, Arkansas, United States, the station is currently owned by Radio Works, Inc. and features programming from Citadel Media.

References

External links
 
 

MGC
Urban adult contemporary radio stations in the United States
Camden, Arkansas